Herman Shumlin (December 6, 1898, Atwood, Colorado – June 4, 1979, New York City) was a prolific Broadway theatrical director and theatrical producer beginning in 1927 with the play Celebrity and continuing through 1974 with a short run of As You Like It, notably with an all-male cast.  He was also the director of two movies, including Watch on the Rhine (1943), which he first directed and produced on Broadway in 1941.

During a Broadway career lasting 47 years, he was the director, producer or both of 45 productions, including three separate productions of The Corn Is Green (1940, 1943, and 1950). Other productions include The Little Foxes (1939), Watch on the Rhine (1941), and Inherit the Wind (1955). Inherit the Wind ran for 806 performances, and was made into a movie in 1960 starring Spencer Tracy, Fredric March, and Gene Kelly, and has been remade three times since, in 1965, 1988, and 1999. Mr. Shumlin taught directing in the Theater Department of The City College of New York in the 1960s and 1970s. Mr Shumlin was also a film director, e.g., Confidential Agent  (1945).

Theatre credits

References

External links

 
 
 Herman Shumlin papers, circa 1902-1989 [bulk 1932-1978], held by the Billy Rose Theatre Division, New York Public Library for the Performing Arts

American theatre directors
1898 births
1979 deaths
People from Logan County, Colorado